Blubaugh Nunatak is a ridge-like nunatak located just south of the mouth of Kansas Glacier where it enters Reedy Glacier. It was mapped by the United States Geological Survey from surveys and from U.S. Navy air photos, 1960–64, and named by the Advisory Committee on Antarctic Names for Donald D. Blubaugh, construction mechanic, Byrd Station winter party, 1957.

References
 

Nunataks of Marie Byrd Land